Giovanni Stefano Ajazza or Giovanni Stefano Agathia or Giovanni Stefano Aiazza (1550–1618) was a Roman Catholic prelate who served as Bishop of Asti (1596–1618).

Biography
Giovanni Stefano Ajazza was born in Vercellen in 1550.
On 13 May 1596, he was appointed during the papacy of Pope Clement VIII as Bishop of Asti.
He served as Bishop of Asti until his death in 1618.

References

External links and additional sources
 (for Chronology of Bishops) 
 (for Chronology of Bishops) 

16th-century Italian Roman Catholic bishops
17th-century Italian Roman Catholic bishops
Bishops appointed by Pope Clement VIII
1550 births
1616 deaths